Johan Brunström and Jean-Julien Rojer were the defending champions, but Marcel Granollers and David Marrero defeated them 3–6, 6–4, [10–6] in the final.

Seeds

Draw

Draw

External Links
 Doubles Draw

UniCredit Czech Open - Doubles
2010 Doubles